Jalal Barjas (also written Jalal Barjes or Jalal Bargas; ; b. 1970) is a Jordanian literary author and journalist, writing in Arabic. A trained engineer, he worked as a newspaper editor and a journalist and has published in a range of genres, including poetry, short stories, novels, and literary articles.

Life and journalistic career 
Barjas was born in 1970 in the village of Hanina, near Madaba, Jordan. He studied aeronautical engineering and worked in this field for years before starting with the Jordanian press as an editor in the Al-Anbat newspaper and later as a reporter for al-Dustour. He also worked as managing editor for a number of cultural magazines, such as Madaba and Pioneers.
He is now Head of the Jordanian Narrative Lab, and Editor-in-Chief of generation sound magazine. he Prepares and presents a cultural radio program entitled House of Novel . He writes cultural articles in a number of Arab newspapers and magazines.

Literary work and distinction 
Among his books are two poetry collections Like Any Branch On A Tree (2008) and A Moon Without tracks (2011); a short story collection entitled The Earthquakes (2012); and the novels Guillotine of the Dreamer, Snakes of Hell, and Women of the Five Senses, the last of which was longlisted for the International Prize for Arabic Fiction (IPAF) in 2019. Thereafter, his most recent novel, Notebooks of the Bookseller (2021), would win the IPAF in 2021. 

In 2015, he won the Katara Prize for Arabic Novel for his Snakes of Fire, the Rifqa Doudin prize for his novel Guillotine of the Dreamer, and the Rukus ibn Za'id al Uzayzi prize for his short fiction,The Earthquakes.

In 2021, his novel Notebooks of the Bookseller won the IPAF. During the award ceremony, Lebanese poet Chawki Bazih, speaking as chairperson of the judges' panel, stated the following about Barjas' work:

References

External links 

 Interview with Jalal Barjas at qantara.de, november 2021

 Newspaper report about Jalal Barjas' "Notebooks of Warraq" 
Newspaper report about Jalal Barjas' "Notebooks of Warraq" - Can an individual shape his life in isolation? 

 Translated excerpts of the six shortlisted novels for IPAF 2021, with a foreword by Bazih

1970 births
Living people
Jordanian novelists
People from Madaba Governorate
International Prize for Arabic Fiction winners